European Protected Species (EPS) are species of plants and animals (other than birds) protected by law throughout the European Union. They are listed in Annexes II and IV of the European Habitats Directive.

The lists include several hundred species of plants and animals. They do not include any fungi, lichens or birds.

European Union states are required under the Habitats Directive to protect the listed species, and for some species (those listed in Annexe II), they are required to designate Special Areas of Conservation (SACs) to protect populations of them.

Birds are omitted from the Annexes because the Habitats Directive does not deal with birds – the equivalent bird species are protected separately under the earlier Birds Directive.

Many species which are not European Protected Species are nevertheless protected by individual EU states.

External links

  Annexe II of European Habitats Directive, listing European Protected Species for which SACs must be created (scientific names only).
 Annexe IV of European Habitats Directive, listing European Protected Species (scientific names only).
.  List of European Protected Species (animals only) including English names where they have them (on Natural England web-page, but includes non-UK species).
  European Protected Species (animals) occurring in UK: scientific and English names.  List from UK Statutory Instrument implementing protection.
  European Protected Species (plants) occurring in UK: scientific and English names.  List from UK Statutory Instrument implementing protection.

Protected Species